Gaia Vuerich (born 4 July 1991) is an Italian cross-country skier. She competed at the 2011 Nordic World Ski Championships in Oslo, and at the 2013 Nordic World Ski Championships in Val di Fiemme. She competed at the 2014 Winter Olympics in Sochi, in the women's sprint.

Cross-country skiing results
All results are sourced from the International Ski Federation (FIS).

Olympic Games

World Championships

World Cup

Season standings

References

External links

1991 births
Living people
Cross-country skiers at the 2014 Winter Olympics
Cross-country skiers at the 2018 Winter Olympics
Italian female cross-country skiers
Olympic cross-country skiers of Italy
Cross-country skiers of Centro Sportivo Carabinieri